Poppy Liu (柳波) is a Chinese-American actress, activist and poet, known for her roles in the sitcoms Sunnyside, Hacks, and iCarly.

Early life and education 
Liu was born in Xi'an, China. Her family moved to Minnesota when she was two while her father, an engineering professor, earned a second PhD. During this time, her mother attended night classes in computer programming and worked at hotels and McDonald's. The family moved back to China when Liu was 14, where she attended an American school in Shanghai. During high school, she became interested in performing, and participated in Chinese dance, ballet and theater. 

Liu attended Colgate University in Hamilton, New York, and majored in women's studies and theater. She graduated in 2013.

Career 
After graduation, Liu founded the production company Collective Sex, with a focus on decolonizing storytelling and eliminating stigmas around sex and identity. In 2018, she debuted her short film Names of Women in New York City, which also toured across the country at college campuses and reproductive organizations. The film was made with an all-female crew and is based on a true abortion story.

In 2019, Liu had a starring role in the NBC sitcom Sunnyside, which moved to Hulu after four episodes. Liu has also had roles on New Amsterdam, Law & Order: Special Victims Unit, and Better Call Saul. She has a recurring role as the blackjack dealer to a wealthy comedian in the 2021 HBO Max sitcom Hacks, and a recurring role as performer Double Dutch on the 2021 Paramount+ sitcom iCarly.

Personal life 
Liu is a doula and offers free services to women of color and transgender people. Liu is nonbinary, uses they/she pronouns, and identifies as queer. She had an abortion in 2015, which inspired a short film she created.

Liu met Jonah Tucker in 2020 and they subsequently began dating. She gave birth to their first child in 2022.

Filmography

Television

References

External links 
 
 

American actors of Chinese descent
Actors from Minnesota
LGBT actresses
Queer actors
American non-binary actors
Chinese non-binary people
Living people
Chinese LGBT actors
LGBT people from Minnesota
American LGBT people of Asian descent
Actors from Shanghai
Actors from Xi'an
Year of birth missing (living people)